Kollam district, earlier called Quilon district, is one of the 14 districts of Kerala state, India. The district is representative of all the natural attributes of Kerala states, and is endowed with a long coastal region, a major sea port on the Arabian Sea, plains and the mountains, lakes, lagoons and Kerala Backwaters, forests and the farm land, and rivers and streams. The area had mercantile relationship with Phoenicians and the Romans.

Professional Colleges

Engineering and Technology Colleges
The TKM College of Engineering was the first Engineering College in Kollam, Later in 1999 College of Engineering Karunagappally was established it was the first Govt. Engineering College (Second Engineering College) in Kollam (Unit of IHRD, Govt of Kerala ) Later in 2000 -2001 College of Engineering Perumon was established ( Under CAPE, Govt. Of Kerala)
 Government & Aided Engineering Colleges
 Thangal Kunju Musaliar College of Engineering, Kollam, Karikode(TKMCE)
 College of Engineering, Karunagappally(CEK)
 College of Engineering, Perumon (CEP)
 College of Engineering, Kottarakkara (CEKRA)
 College of Engineering, Pathanapuram (CEPRM)
Private Self-Financing Engineering Colleges
 Pinnacle School of Engineering and Technology, Anchal, Kollam
 Basilous Mathew II College of Engineering, Sasthamcottah
 Bishop Jerome College of Engineering and Technology, Kollam
 Hindustan College of Engineering, Arippa, Kulathuppuzha
 MES Institute of Technology And Management, Chathannoor
 S.H.M. Engineering College, Kadakkal
 TKM Institute of Technology, Karuvelil
 Travancore Engineering College, Roadvila, Oyoor
 U K F College of Engineering & Technology, Meenambalam.
 Younus College of Engineering & Technology, Pallimukku
 Younus College of Engineering for Women, Kottarakkara, Kollam
 Younus Institute of Technology, Kannanalloor.
 Amrita School of Engineering, Vallikavu, Clappana, Kollam

Medical Institutions

 Government Medical College, Kollam 
 Azeezia Medical College, Meeyannoor
 Travancore Medical College, Medicity, Kollam
 Sree Narayana Institute of Ayurvedic Studies & Research, Karimpinpuzha, Puthoor, Kollam
 Amrita Ayurveda Medical College, Karunagappally, Kollam

Business & Management Institutes

 T K M Institute of Management, Kollam
 Member Sree Narayana Pillai Institute of Management & Technology, Mukundapuram, Chavara, Kollam
 Bishop Jerome School of Management, Kollam
 Institute of Management-Kerala, Kollam
 Institute of Management-Kerala, Kundara
 Travancore Business Academy, Vadakkevila, Kollam
 Gurudev Institute of Management Studies (GIMS), Kadakkal
 Sankar Institute of Science, Technology and Management, Chathannoor
 Horizon Educational Foundation, Kollam
 Quilon Institute of Technology for Women, Kollam
 Gurudev Institute of Management Studies, Kadakkal
 Sankar Institute of Science Technology and Management, Chathanoor
 MSN Institute of Management and Technology, Mukundapuram P.O, Chavara

Architecture Colleges
 Thangal Kunju Musaliar College of Engineering, Kollam, Karikode
 Nizar Rahim & Mark School of Architecture, Madannada, Kollam
 Bishop Jerome Institute, Karbala, Kollam

Design Institutes 
 Kerala State Institute of Design

Law Colleges
 Sree Narayana Guru College of Legal Studies, Kollam
 N.S.S Law College, Kottiyam

Nursing Colleges
 Bishop Benziger College of Nursing, Kollam
 Upasana College of Nursing, Kollam
 Travancore College of Nursing, Kollam
 Holy Cross College of Nursing, Kottiyam
 Azeezia Nursing College, Meeyannoor, Kollam
 Mercy college of Nursing, Kottarakkara, Kollam
 Vijaya College of Nursing, Kottarakkara, Kollam
 Vellapalli Natesan Shashtiabdapoorthi Smaraka College of Nursing, Kollam
 St. Joseph's College of Nursing, Kollam
 Royal College of Nursing, Chathannoor

Polytechnic Colleges

 Sree Narayana Poly (SN Poly) Technic College (S N P T C), Kottiyam
 Government Polytechnic College, Punalur
 Government Polytechnic College, Ezhukone
 Model Polytechnic College, Karunagappally, Kollam

Fashion Technology Colleges
 Apparel Training and Design Center (ATDC Vocational College)
 Institute of Fashion Technology Kerala (IFTK), Vellimon, Kollam

MCA Colleges
 Mar Baselios Institute of Technology, Anchal
 Marthoma College of Science and Technology, Ayur
 Sree Narayana Institute Of Technology, Vadakkevila, Kollam

Training & B.Ed Centres
 Badhiriya B.Ed.Training College
 Jamia Training College
 Valiyam Memorial College of Teacher Education
 Haneefa Kunju Memorial College Of Education
 Sri Vidyadhiraja Model College of Teacher Education
 Millath College Of Teacher Education, Sooranadu
 College of Teacher Education, Arkannoor, Ayur
 Sabarigiri College of Education, Anchal
 Fathima Memorial Training College, Mylapore
 Mannam Foundation Centre For Education Technology, Kollam
 Rama Vilasom Training College, Valakom
 Mannam Memorial Training College, Punalur
 Baselios Marthoma Mathews II Training College
 Fathima Memorial Training College, Pallimukku
 Karmela Rani Training College, Kollam
 Mount Tabor Training College, Pathanapuram
 Manjappara Educational And Charitable Trust B.Ed. College

Arts and Science Colleges
 Mar Thoma College of Science and Technology, Ayur
 Sree Narayana College, Kollam
 Sree Narayana College for Women, Kollam
 Fatima Matha National College, Kollam
 MMNSS College Kottiyam
 T.K.M. College of Arts & Science, Kollam
 Marthoma college of science & technology, Ayur
 Sree Sankara Sanskrit Vithyapeedom College Edakkidom
 Devaswom Board College, Sasthamcotta
 College of Applied Science IHRD, Kundara
 Baby John Memorial Government College, Chavara
 St. John's College, Anchal
 St. Stephen's College, Pathanapuram
 St. Gregorios College, Kottarakkara
 N.S.S. College, Nilamel
 Sree Narayana College, Punalur
 Sree Narayana College, Chathannur
 Sree Vidyadhiraja College of Arts and Science, Karunagappally
 P.M.S.A Pookoya Thangal Memorial Arts & Science College
 UIT, Mulamkadakom

See also
 List of colleges affiliated to University of Kerala
 List of colleges affiliated with Cochin University of Science and Technology
 List of Engineering Colleges in Kerala
 List of Medical Colleges in Kerala
 List of schools in Kollam district

References

Lists of universities and colleges in Kerala
Education in Kollam district